Uganda is a presidential republic in which the President of Uganda is the head of state and the prime minister is the head of government business. There is a multi-party system. Executive power is exercised by the government. Legislative power is given to both the government and the National Assembly. The system is based on a democratic parliamentary system with equal rights for all citizens over 18 years of age.

Political culture

In a measure ostensibly designed to reduce sectarian violence, political parties were restricted in their activities from 1986. In the non-party "Movement" system instituted by President Yoweri Museveni, political parties continued to exist but could not campaign in elections or field candidates directly (although electoral candidates could belong to political parties). A constitutional referendum canceled this 19-year ban on multi-party politics in July 2005.

Presidential elections were held in February 2006. Museveni ran against several candidates, of whom the most prominent was the exiled Dr. Kizza Besigye. Museveni was declared the winner. Besigye alleged fraud, and rejected the result. The Supreme Court of Uganda ruled that the election was marred by intimidation, violence, voter disenfranchisement, and other irregularities. However, the Court voted 4-3 to uphold the results of the election.

Executive

|President
|Yoweri Museveni
|National Resistance Movement
|26 January 1986
|-
|Prime Minister
|Robinah Nabbanja
|National Resistance Movement
|21 June 2021
|}
The head of state in Uganda is the President, who is elected by a popular vote to a five-year term. This is currently Yoweri Museveni, who is also the head of the armed forces. The previous presidential elections were in February 2011, and in the election of February 2016, Museveni was elected with 68 percent of the vote. The cabinet is appointed by the president from among the elected legislators. The prime minister, Robina Nabbanja, assists the president in the supervision of the cabinet.

The Cabinet of Uganda, according to the Constitution of Uganda, "shall consist of the President, the Vice President and such number of Ministers as may appear to the President to be reasonably necessary for the efficient running of the State."

Ministries of Uganda
The below are the ministries in Uganda:

Ministry of Foreign Affairs
Ministry of Justice & Constitutional Affairs
Ministry of Public Service
Ministry of Finance, Planning, and Economic Development
Ministry of Education and Sports
Ministry for Karamoja Affairs
Ministry of Local Government
Ministry of Science, Technology and Innovation
Ministry of Health
Ministry of Works and Transport
Ministry of Lands, Housing & Urban Development
Ministry of Internal Affairs
Ministry of Tourism, Wildlife and Antiquities
Ministry of Water and Environment
Ministry of Gender, Labour & Social Development
Ministry of Energy and Mineral Development
Ministry of Security
Ministry of Defence and Veterans Affairs
Ministry of Agriculture, Animal Industry and Fisheries
Ministry of Information and Communications Technology
Ministry of Disaster Preparedness and Refugees
Ministry of Trade, Industry and Cooperatives

Political parties and elections

Presidential elections

The most recent presidential elections in Uganda were held on 14 January 2021 featuring 11 aspirants comprising 10 men and 1 woman.

The announced but contested results are as follows;

Source: Uganda Electoral Commission

In 2021, the pop star-turned-politician Bobi Wine (also known as Robert Kyagulanyi Sentamu), challenged the election results in the country's highest court (Supreme Court) seeking to over-turn Museveni's victory. The highly contested elections was marred with violence, the European Parliament voiced outrage, condemnation and for sanctions against individuals and organisations responsible for human rights violations in Uganda.

The results of the most recent presidential election from 2021 are as below:

Parliamentary elections
The results of the most recent parliamentary election from 2021 are as below:

Judiciary
The Ugandan judiciary operates as an independent branch of government and consists of magistrate's courts, high courts, courts of appeal (which organizes itself as the Constitutional Court of Uganda when hearing constitutional issues), and the Supreme Court. Judges for the High Court are appointed by the president; Judges for the Court of Appeal are appointed by the president and approved by the legislature.

Foreign relations

A fight between the Ugandan and Libyan presidential guards sparked chaos during a ceremony attended by the heads of state from 11 African nations on March 19, 2008.

International organization participation

See also

 List of government ministries of Uganda
 Cabinet of Uganda
 Parliament of Uganda
 Supreme Court of Uganda

References

Sources 
Uganda's opposition join forces (BBC News, 16 February 2004)
"Uganda 'night commuters' flee rebel brutality" (Yahoo News, October 17, 2005)
Tripp, Aili Mari, Museveni’s Uganda: Paradoxes of Power in a Hybrid Regime, Lynne Rienner Publishers, 2010.

External links
Parliament of Uganda
State House of Uganda
Constitution of the Republic of Uganda
Party Politics in Uganda, 1963-2000, Christina Nyströmee